HRB may refer to:

 HRB (gene)
 HRB Systems, an American defense contractor
 Boeing HRB-1, a helicopter
 Croatian Revolutionary Brotherhood
 FBI Human Resources Branch, US
 H&R Block, NYSE symbol
 Harbin Taiping International Airport,  Heilongjiang, China
 Health Research Board, Ireland
 House of Responsibility, in Hitler's birth house, Braunau am Inn, Germany
 HRB, a Rockwell scale of materials' hardness